The 2018 Stock Light is the sixteenth season of Stock Light. The 2018 season marks the first season since 2007, after the series endured an eleven-year absence.

Teams and drivers
All cars were powered by V8 engines and used the JL chassis. All drivers were Brazilian-registered except for Odair dos Santos, who raced under a Paraguayan racing license.

Race calendar and results
All races were held in Brazil.

Championship standings
Points system
Points are awarded for each race at an event to the driver/s of a car that completed at least 75% of the race distance and was running at the completion of the race. 

Feature Race: Used for the first race.
Sprint Race: Used for the first and second race, with partially reversed (top ten) of each event.
Final race: Used for the last round of the season with double points.

Drivers' Championship

References

External links
 Official website

Stock Car Brasil
Stock Light